Epilucina is a genus of small saltwater clams, marine bivalve mollusks in the family Lucinidae, the lucines. The only extant species is Epilucina californica, found from central California to Baja California.

The species in this genus were originally assigned to the genus Lucina, and later erected as the genus Phacoides by William Healey Dall.

Species
The only extant species is E. californica. Extinct species within the genus Epilucina include:
Epilucina washingtoniana (Washington, Oregon, California)
Epilucina concentrica (France, United Kingdom)
Epilucina gabrielensis (Colombia)

Bivalve genera
Lucinidae
Taxa named by William Healey Dall
Marine molluscs of North America